Tasso Wild (born 1 December 1940) is a former German football midfielder who played for 1. FC Nürnberg and Hertha BSC.

Career 
Wild started his career with 1. FC Nürnberg. Between 1959 and 1963, he made 74 appearances for in the Oberliga Süd, scoring 37 goals, and won the German football championship with the club in 1961. He also scored the winning goal for Nürnberg in the final of the 1961–62 DFB-Pokal against Fortuna Düsseldorf. He made a further 79 appearances for the club in the Bundesliga between 1963 and 1967, scoring 18 goals.

Wild was signed by Hertha BSC in 1967. He appeared 88 times for the club in the Bundesliga, scoring seven goals. In 1971, Wild was banned by the DFB from playing in German football for his involvement in the 1971 Bundesliga scandal. Although the ban was later lifted, Wild did not return to professional football.

After retiring, Wild served briefly as vice-chairman at 1. FC Nürnberg.

Honours 
 German football championship: 1961
 DFB-Pokal: 1962

References

External links 
 

1940 births
Living people
German footballers
Association football midfielders
Bundesliga players
1. FC Nürnberg players
Hertha BSC players